Tischer is a German surname. Notable people with the surname include:

Anuschka Tischer (born 1968), Robert Bosch Foundation Lecturer for History at the University of Riga
Janine Tischer (born 1984), German bobsledder
Mae Tischer (1928-2018), American politician
Simon Tischer (born 1982), German volleyball player

See also
Tischner

German-language surnames